Darevskia parvula, the red-bellied lizard, is a lizard species in the genus Darevskia. It is found in Georgia and Turkey.

References

Darevskia
Reptiles described in 1913
Taxa named by Amédée Louis Lantz
Taxa named by August Otto Cyrén